Smaragda Karydi is a Greek TV and stage actress. She came into prominence playing the role of Dahlia in the TV series Sto Para Pente and later the TV series Fila ton vatraho sou (Frog or not) co-starring with Τhodoris Atheridis.

Early days
Smaragda was born on 9 August 1969, and is the daughter of actors Dinos Karydis (whom she later starred with in Fila ton vatraho sou) (Frog or not) and Tzoulia Argyropoulos. 

She graduated from the Drama School of the Greek National Theatre and has worked as an actress in the Greek television in primary and secondary roles in the series. From 2005 until 2007 she has had one of the main roles in the popular TV series Sto Para Pente.

She has also starred in the films Thiliki Etairia written by Nikos Perakis in 1999, O kalyteros mou filos written by Lakis Lazopoulos and the cinema adaptation of the theatrical play Mia melissa ton Avgousto written by Thodoris Atheridis in 2007.

In the theatre she has starred in the plays Apo erota, Mia melissa ton Avgousto, and Sinevi kai opoios thelei to pistevei written and directed by Thodoris Atheridis.

Selected filmography

Television
1992-1993 - Vamena kokkina mallia (Βαμμένα κόκκινα μαλλιά; Dyed red hair)
1994 - To Harama (Το χάραμα)
1996 - To Hroma tou fengariou] (Το χρώμα το φεγγαριού; The colour of the moon)
1996 - Logo timis ("Λόγω τιμής"; Because of Honour)
1996 - Dipli Alithia (Διπλή αλήθεια; Double truth)
1998 - Gia sena (Για σένα; For you)
1999 - Eroica
2002 - Ah ke na 'kseres (Αχ! και να 'ξερες; If you only knew!)
2003 - Lefkos Ikos (Λευκός Οίκος; White house)
2004 - Babballoo (Μπαμπαλού)
2005 - Sto Para Pente (Στο Παρά Πέντε, In the nick of time)
2007 - Fila to vatraho sou (Φίλα τον βατραχό σου; Kiss your frog)
2015 - Ethniki Ellados (Εθνική Ελλάδος; The Greece national football team)
2020 - Min Arxizeis Tin Mourmoura (Μην Αρχίζεις Την Μουρμούρα; Don't start your whingeing)

Cinema
1999 - Thiliki Eteria (Θηλυκή Εταιρεία)
2001 - O kalyteros mou filos (My best friend)
2007 - Mia Melissa ton Avgousto (Μια μέλισσα τον Αύγουστο)
2009 - H Klironomos (Η Κληρονόμος)

Theatre
Apo Erota (Από έρωτα)
Mia Melissa Ton Avgousto (Μια μέλισσα τον Αύγουστο)
Synevi ki opis theli to pistevi (Συνέβη κι όποιος θέλει το πιστεύει)
The Witches of Smyrna (Οι Μάγισσες της Σμύρνης)
The Wedding of Koutroulis (Του Κουτρούλη ο γάμος)
Noises Off (Το σώσε)

References

External links
 

Greek television actresses
Greek voice actresses
Living people
1969 births